Azzedine Boukerche is a Distinguished University  Professor (Professor Eminent) and Canada Research Chair Tier-1 at the University of Ottawa, Ontario, Canada.

Career
Boukerche is a founding director of PARADISE Research Laboratory at Ottawa University.

References

External links
Azzedine Boukerche

20th-century births
Living people
Canadian electrical engineers
Fellow Members of the IEEE
Fellows of the American Association for the Advancement of Science
Fellows of the Canadian Academy of Engineering
Fellows of the Engineering Institute of Canada
Year of birth missing (living people)
Place of birth missing (living people)